The meridian 52° west of Greenwich is a line of longitude that extends from the North Pole across the Arctic Ocean, Greenland, the Atlantic Ocean, South America, the Southern Ocean, and Antarctica to the South Pole.

The 52nd meridian west forms a great circle with the 128th meridian east.

From Pole to Pole
Starting at the North Pole and heading south to the South Pole, the 52nd meridian west passes through:

{| class="wikitable plainrowheaders"
! scope="col" width="120" | Co-ordinates
! scope="col" | Country, territory or sea
! scope="col" | Notes
|-
| style="background:#b0e0e6;" | 
! scope="row" style="background:#b0e0e6;" | Arctic Ocean
| style="background:#b0e0e6;" |
|-
| style="background:#b0e0e6;" | 
! scope="row" style="background:#b0e0e6;" | Lincoln Sea
| style="background:#b0e0e6;" |
|-valign="top"
| 
! scope="row" | 
| Castle Island, Hendrik Island and Warming Land
|-
| style="background:#b0e0e6;" | 
! scope="row" style="background:#b0e0e6;" | Uummannaq Fjord
| style="background:#b0e0e6;" |
|-
| 
! scope="row" | 
| Appat Island
|-
| style="background:#b0e0e6;" | 
! scope="row" style="background:#b0e0e6;" | Uummannaq Fjord
| style="background:#b0e0e6;" |
|-
| 
! scope="row" | 
| Nuussuaq Peninsula
|-
| style="background:#b0e0e6;" | 
! scope="row" style="background:#b0e0e6;" | Sullorsuaq Strait
| style="background:#b0e0e6;" |
|-
| 
! scope="row" | 
| Disko Island
|-
| style="background:#b0e0e6;" | 
! scope="row" style="background:#b0e0e6;" | Disko Bay
| style="background:#b0e0e6;" |
|-
| 
! scope="row" | 
|
|-
| style="background:#b0e0e6;" | 
! scope="row" style="background:#b0e0e6;" | Atlantic Ocean
| style="background:#b0e0e6;" |
|-
| 
! scope="row" | 
| French Guiana
|-valign="top"
| 
! scope="row" | 
|-
| style="background:#b0e0e6;" | 
! scope="row" style="background:#b0e0e6;" | Atlantic Ocean
| style="background:#b0e0e6;" |
|-
| style="background:#b0e0e6;" | 
! scope="row" style="background:#b0e0e6;" | Southern Ocean
| style="background:#b0e0e6;" |
|-valign="top"
| 
! scope="row" | Antarctica
|-
|}

See also
51st meridian west
53rd meridian west

w052 meridian west